

See also 
 United States House of Representatives elections, 1796 and 1797
 List of United States representatives from South Carolina

References 

1796
South Carolina
United States House of Representatives